Sydney is the state capital of New South Wales and the most populous city in Australia.

Sydney may also refer to:

Places

Australia
City of Sydney, inner city local government area of New South Wales
Sydney central business district, which is officially the suburb of "Sydney, New South Wales"
Electoral district of Sydney, electorate in state parliament of New South Wales
Division of Sydney, electorate in federal parliament of Australia
Sydney Island, Queensland

Canada
Sydney, Nova Scotia
North Sydney, Nova Scotia

United States
Sydney, Florida, unincorporated community

Film and television
 Sydney (film), the original title of the 1996 Hard Eight (film)
 Sydney (TV series), a 1990 CBS TV series
 Sydney Film Festival, an annual competitive film festival held in Sydney, Australia
 Sydney Film School, a private film school based in Waterloo, a suburb of Sydney
 Sydney Filmmakers Co-operative, was a co-operative of independent filmmakers

Transportation
Blackburn Sydney, a British flying boat
HMAS Sydney, several warships in the Royal Australian Navy
Sydney (ship), an Australian cargo ship

People
Sydney (name), including a list of people and characters with the name
Robert Yates (politician) (1738–1801), American politician and presumed author with pseudonym "Sydney"

Other uses
Sydney Accord
Sydney Declaration
Sydney language
University of Sydney
Sydney FC, a professional soccer club
"Sydney", a song by Puddle of Mudd from Life On Display
"Sydney", a song by Caravan Palace from Panic
Sydney, the codename for Microsoft Bing's implementation of ChatGPT

See also
Sydney White, a 2007 film starring Amanda Bynes
Sydney Cove, a small bay on the southern shore of Sydney Harbour
Sydney Heads, that form the two-kilometre-wide entrance to Sydney Harbour
Sydney Parade Avenue, Ireland
Sydnee (disambiguation)
Sidney (disambiguation)
Sidnei
Sid (disambiguation)
Syd (disambiguation)